This is a list of players who played at least one game for the New England Whalers (1972–73 to 1978–79) of the World Hockey Association (WHA). For a list of players who played for the Whalers in the National Hockey League, see List of Hartford Whalers players.


A
Christer Abrahamsson,
Thommy Abrahamsson,
Kevin Ahearn,
Mike Antonovich,
Danny Arndt,

B
Ralph Backstrom,
Bill Berglund,
Don Blackburn,
Dan Bolduc,
Don Borgeson,
Jeff Brubaker,
Ron Busniuk,
Bill Butters,
Mike Byers,

C
Terry Caffery,
Brett Callighen,
Wayne Carleton,
Jack Carlson,
Steve Carlson,
Greg Carroll,
Bob Charlebois,
Ron Climie,
Gaye Cooley,
John Cunniff,

D
John Danby,
Jim Dorey,
Jordy Douglas,

E
Tommy Earl,

F
Nick Fotiu,
John French,

G
John Garrett,
Marty Gateman,
Ted Green,

H
Alan Hangsleben,
Dave Hanson,
Hugh Harris,
Paul Hoganson,
Gordie Howe,
Mark Howe,
Marty Howe,
Paul Hurley,
Mike Hyndman,
Dave Hynes,

I
Dave Inkpen,

J
Ric Jordan,

K
Al Karlander,
Mike Keeler,
Dave Keon,

L
Andre Lacroix,
Bruce Landon,
Jean-Louis Levasseur,
Rick Ley,
George Lyle,

M
Gary MacGregor,
Bryan Maxwell,
Jim Mayer,
John McKenzie,
Bob McManama,
Gerry Methe,
Warren Miller,

O
Fred O'Donnell,
Ted Ouimet,

P
Rosaire Paiement,
Andre Peloffy,
Larry Pleau,
Ron Plumb,

R
Cap Raeder,
Steve Richardson,
Doug Roberts,
Gordie Roberts,
Mike Rogers,
Pierre Roy,

S
Dick Sarrazin,
Brit Selby,
Brad Selwood,
Timothy Sheehy,
Dale Smedsmo,
Al Smith,
Guy Smith,
Blaine Stoughton,
Garry Swain,

T
Jim Troy,

W
Jim Warner,
Tom Webster,
Tom Williams,

References
WHA Whalers on Hockeydb

New England Whalers
New England Whalers players